Alex Young (7 October 1879 – 30 June 1963) was an Australian rules footballer who played for the St Kilda Football Club in the Victorian Football League (VFL).

References

External links 

1879 births
1963 deaths
Australian rules footballers from Melbourne
St Kilda Football Club players
People from Oakleigh, Victoria